Rondotia diaphana is a moth in the family Bombycidae. It was described by George Hampson in 1893. It is found in China, Myanmar, India and Vietnam.

References

Bombycidae
Moths described in 1893
Moths of Asia
Taxa named by George Hampson